The Vivanti–Pringsheim theorem is a mathematical statement in complex analysis, that determines a specific singularity for a function described by certain type of power series. The theorem was originally formulated by Giulio Vivanti  in 1893 and proved in the following year by Alfred Pringsheim.

More precisely the theorem states the following:

A complex function defined by a power series 
 

A simple example is the (complex) geometric series 

References 
Reinhold Remmert: The Theory of Complex Functions. Springer Science & Business Media, 1991, p. 235
I-hsiung Lin: Classical Complex Analysis: A Geometric Approach (Volume 2). World Scientific Publishing Company, 2010,  p. 45

Theorems in complex analysis